Building at 810 Wabash Avenue is a historic commercial building located at Terre Haute, Vigo County, Indiana. It was built about 1870, and is a two-story, rectangular, Italianate style brick building.  It features an elaborate cast iron storefront on the first story and round arched windows on the second.

It was listed on the National Register of Historic Places in 1983.

References

Commercial buildings on the National Register of Historic Places in Indiana
Italianate architecture in Indiana
Commercial buildings completed in 1870
Buildings and structures in Terre Haute, Indiana
National Register of Historic Places in Terre Haute, Indiana